Alabino is a rural locality in the Moscow Oblast of Russia. With a population of over 600 people, it is part of the urban settlement of Selyatino. Until 2006, Alabino was part of the Petrovsky Rural District.

The town hosts a proving ground of the Russian Ground Forces, utilizing it during rehearsals in late March towards 17–18 April every year for the Moscow Victory Day Parade, where in the parade is being tuned up for the main performance on Victory Day (9 May). On jubilee years, many foreign contingents from countries such as Moldova, China, India and Kazakhstan have stayed a lodging in the proving ground. The training field is also a site of many training exercises involving the Ground Forces. One of the main attractions in the town is the Petrovskoye-Alabino, a ruined country house which was considered to be "one of the most splendid of Moscow's country estates". The village's main form of transport has been provided since the early 20th century by the Kiyevsky suburban railway line which stops in the village to pick citizens at the train station.

Gallery

References

External links 
 Справочно-информационный сайт городского поселения Селятино
 Официальный сайт городского поселения Селятино
 Карта Наро-Фоминского района

Rural localities in Moscow Oblast